Andrew Roy Leslie  (born 10 November 1944) is a former New Zealand rugby union player. A number eight, he represented Wellington domestically and captained the All Black at international level. He was captain during the controversial 1976 New Zealand rugby union tour of South Africa. On 26 April 2007 he was elected as the president of the New Zealand Rugby Football Union.

In the 2001 Queen's Birthday Honours, Leslie was appointed a Member of the New Zealand Order of Merit, for services to rugby.

All Black Statistics
Tests: 10 (10 as Captain)
Games: 24 (23 as Captain)
Total Matches: 34 (33 as Captain)
Test Points: 4pts (1t, 0c, 0p, 0dg, 0m)
Game Points: 24pts (6t, 0c, 0p, 0dg, 0m)
Total Points: 28pts (7t, 0c, 0p, 0dg, 0m)

References

External links

 

1944 births
Living people
New Zealand international rugby union players
Members of the New Zealand Order of Merit
New Zealand rugby union players
Rugby union number eights
Wellington rugby union players
Rugby union players from Lower Hutt
New Zealand justices of the peace